This is a list of all Olympic champions of Ukraine (since Ukraine has taken part in the Games as a separate representation). As of February 24, 2014 there are 41 Olympic champions which represented Ukraine (5 at Winter Games and 36 at Summer). Athletes are sorted by number of gold medals and then by surname.

The first Olympic champion of separate Ukrainian representation was figure skater Oksana Baiul at the 1994 Winter Olympics in Lillehammer; the first of a Summer Olympic Games was wrestler Vyacheslav Oleynyk at the 1996 Games in Atlanta. The first Ukraine-born gold medal winner was Bobbie Rosenfeld (a Canadian athlete) at the 1928 Summer Olympics in Amsterdam.
Data as of end of 2016 Olympics.

Winter Olympic Games

Summer Olympic Games

References

 IOC - Olympic Medal Winners

 
Olympic
Ukraine
Ukraine at the Olympics